The 2013 VLN Series was the 36th season of the VLN.

The fourth race was marred by the death of 55-year-old German driver Wolfgang Dess, who raced under the nom de course "Wolf Silvester". While in contention for victory in the CUP1 class, he was seen to lose control of his No. 350 Opel Astra OPC before the car came to a rest at Schwalbenschwanz. Marshals found him motionless in the driver's seat. Numerous attempts were made to resuscitate him at the trackside and on the way to the circuit's medical centre, but he was later pronounced dead by the chief medical officer. It is suspected that Dess suffered a heart attack while racing.

Calendar

Race Results
Results indicate overall winners only.

Footnotes

References

External links 
 
 

2013 in German motorsport
Nürburgring Endurance Series seasons